Amarnauth Ramcharitar (born 18 August 1958) is a Guyanese cricketer. He played in one List A and seven first-class matches for Guyana from 1978 to 1984.

See also
 List of Guyanese representative cricketers

References

External links
 

1958 births
Living people
Guyanese cricketers
Guyana cricketers